"Dark Streets of London" is the debut single by the London-based Celtic punk band The Pogues, released in 1984. The song was written by Pogues frontman Shane MacGowan and is featured on the band's 1984 debut album Red Roses for Me. The B-side is "And the Band Played Waltzing Matilda" (which clocks in at 4:50 and is different from the version which appears on their second album).

References

1984 debut singles
Songs about London
Songs about streets
Songs written by Shane MacGowan
The Pogues songs
1984 songs